New Mexico Rattler is a wooden roller coaster located at Cliff's Amusement Park in Albuquerque, New Mexico. The roller coaster was designed and manufactured by Custom Coasters International (CCI); the park completed the attraction after CCI went bankrupt in July 2002. The New Mexico Rattler opened on September 28, 2002, having cost $2 million.

The New Mexico Rattler spans the entire length of the park but only occupies  of land. Located in the southwest section, the roller coaster navigates over different attractions throughout the park. The New Mexico Rattler utilizes a steel support structure with a wooden track. The layout incorporates elements of an out and back and twister roller coaster. Upon opening, the roller coaster generally received positive reviews from guests and critics, and it received several awards.

History
The addition of a major roller coaster to the Cliff's Amusement Park was proposed over ten years. The growing size of Albuquerque, New Mexico was a contributing factor in constructing the roller coaster; as by the early 2000s, the park could back a large addition with the nearby population. In the aftermath of the September 11 attacks, park co-owner Gary Hays pushed the construction of its conceived roller coaster by a year to help in the recovery of tourism. Then-mayor of Albuquerque, Martin Chávez, assisted in facilitating permits for the park to build the roller coaster in 2002; in part, facing some opposition from city hall. Hays contracted Custom Coasters International (CCI) to manufacture and build the roller coaster in January 2002, based on their reputation and deals offered. A month later, groundbreaking and construction of the roller coaster began.

Park owners Gary and Linda Hays, as well as Chávez, announced the construction of the roller coaster at the Albuquerque city hall on February 20, 2002. The unnamed wooden roller coaster would cost $2 million dollars to construct by CCI, and have a projected opening date for June 21. Park officials simultaneously announced a contest for the public to submit names through local Wendy's locations for the attraction. Park officials wanted to advertise the roller coaster to an adult demographic, and would increase park admission prices. The construction of the roller coaster would result in "15 to 30 jobs" being added, with the park aiming for an increase in attendance for the 2003 season. Installation of concrete foundations began after the roller coaster's announcement.

The contest ended in April 2002, with the name, "New Mexico Rattler", chosen from a 4-year-old's submission in May. The owners selected the name because of its likeness to the predator and state. In early May, steel supports began to be built, with construction of the wooden track taking place soon after. The park began advertising the New Mexico Rattler on billboards during the summer season to promote its roller coaster. The roller coaster's anticipated opening date was set back in June due to construction delays; a new opening date scheduled for mid-July. A second set back to its opening date in July delayed the roller coaster's opening near the fall season, due to pending delivery of construction materials. In late July, manufacturer CCI filed for Chapter 7 bankruptcy in the U.S. District Court for the Southern District of Ohio, ending operation. 

At the time of the manufacturer's bankruptcy, the "roller coaster was 95% finished". Following CCI's closure, the park employed seventeen previous workers from manufacturer and another eight workers to finish the roller coaster. The delays caused additional costs to the $2 million initially slated for its construction, and the bankruptcy was partially attributed by industry experts to the amusement market decline. Advertising on billboard's originally with the roller coaster would be absent until its opening. Final test runs for the roller coaster were conducted on September 27, 2002, and would open the next day, September 28.

Ride experience

After leaving the station, the train dips to the right before ascending the 25.4-degree,  lift hill. It then traverses a series of left-banked hills before descending into a drop. The train ascends to the left before dropping into a succession of curved hills; thereafter entering a right-banked hill. Following the banked turn, the train continually descends into the  tunnel, emerging in an upward right banked turn. The train continues downward into a right turn, ascending a few hills before banking into the left turn. Exiting the turn, the train goes slightly right into the final brake run; before turning right to enter the station. One cycle of the roller coaster takes approximately a minute and fifteen seconds the complete.

Characteristics 
The New Mexico Rattler was primarily designed, manufactured, and constructed by Custom Coasters International. Before the manufacture's closure, there were around 25 people who worked on building the wooden roller coaster, both from the company and locally. Engineering plans for the roller coaster took a month to complete. The roller coaster spans the entirety of the amusement park. The park relocated several attractions as a result of New Mexico Rattler's construction. In addition, the roller coaster navigates over multiple rides and trees. The New Mexico Rattler was the first major roller coaster built in New Mexico.

Contrasting from traditional wooden roller coasters, the New Mexico Rattler utilizes steel supports, which required less area to support the wooden track. The roller coaster combines features an out and back and twister layout. The roller coaster exerts a maximum of 3.1 g-forces to its riders. The New Mexico Rattler operates with one train, which has six cars that contain two rows of two seats, allowing a maximum capacity of 24 people. The train was built by Philadelphia Toboggan Coasters. Each seat contains a lap bar restraint system.

Reception
Upon opening, the New Mexico Rattler generally received positive reviews from guests and critics. Leanne Potts, a writer for the Albuquerque Journal, commented on the roller coaster's nonstop pacing, stating there were "no pauses in the ride, no slowing down". Potts also remarked that after the initial drop "the speed is unrelenting", relating the experience to that of falling "off a five-story building and living to tell about it". Potts recorded several guests reactions to the roller coaster, with one guest commenting on the different positive ride experiences in the front and back, with another expressing their enthusiasm for the roller coaster, wanting to ride it again.

Awards 
During the International Association of Amusement Parks and Attractions (IAAPA) 2003 exposition, the park earned two Brass Ring's in relation to its press kit and billboard advertisements for the New Mexico Rattler. The Cliff's Amusement Park owners also earned the "2003 best promotion award" for actualizing the wooden roller coaster and marketing efforts. The New Mexico Rattler received various placements on Amusement Today's Golden Ticket Awards as being one of the top wooden roller coasters.

References

External links 

Buildings and structures in Albuquerque, New Mexico
Roller coasters introduced in 2002
Western (genre) amusement rides
2002 establishments in New Mexico
Roller coasters in New Mexico